St Liz is a surname which may refer to two Members of Parliament for Rutland, England:

Richard de St Liz (fl. 1328–1336), English politician
William de St Liz (fl. 1312), English politician

See also
St Elizabeth (disambiguation)